Ivo Barnabò Micheli (29 January 1942 - 20 July 2005) was an Italian Film director and screenwriter from the German-speaking  South Tyrol / Alto Adige region.

Filmography (selection)
 1970: La memoria di Kunz
 1971: I corvi / Die Raben
 1972: Cesare Zavattini: „Sprechen wir viel von mir“
 1977: Heinrich Böll
 1978: Eritrea
 1984: Eingeklemmt. Notizen für einen Film über Norbert C. Kaser
 1985: Il lungo inverno / Lange Wintertage
 1985: A futura memoria: Pier Paolo Pasolini / Annäherung an einen Freibeuter
 1988: Roberto Rossellini: I giorni dell'avventura / Tage der Abenteuer
 1989: „Eppur si muove!“ / „Und sie bewegt sich doch!“ Der Prozess Galileo Galilei
 1992: Im Visier: Die letzten Tage der Menschheit. Ein Film über Karl Kraus, den Krieg und die Journalisten
 1996: Timbuktu oder Der Traum von einem Ziel 1997: Mila 23. C'era una volta il Danubio / Es war einmal die Donau 2001: Grenzen 2001: George Tabori: Mein Kampf. Filmnotizen zum gleichnamigen BühnenstückReferences
 Joachim Gatterer/Jessica Alexandra Micheli (ed.): Ivo Barnabò Micheli. Poesie der Gegensätze. Cinema radicale'', Folio, Wien-Bozen 2015, .
 Daniel Brandlechner: Sprechen wir viel vom Ungesehenen. Ivo Barnabò Micheli. In: Skolast 1/2018 (63. Jg.), S. 42–44.

External links
 

Italian film directors
20th-century Italian screenwriters
Italian male screenwriters
1942 births
2005 deaths
20th-century Italian male writers